Altona, also called Hamburg-Altona, is a borough of the German city of Hamburg.

Hamburg-Altona may also refer to:
Altona-Nord, or Hamburg-Altona-Nord, a district within Altona
Altona-Altstadt, or Hamburg-Altona-Altstadt, a district within Altona
Hamburg-Altona (electoral district)
Hamburg-Altona station
Hamburg-Altona–Kiel railway
Hamburg-Altona–Neumünster railway
Hamburg-Altona link line
Fischmarkt Hamburg-Altona, a logistics company in Hamburg, Germany
Luna Park Hamburg-Altona, an amusement park in Hamburg, Germany

Other uses
Hamburg Altona (film), a 1989 Yugoslav film